A by-election was held for the New South Wales Legislative Assembly electorate of East Macquarie on 15 August 1879 because of the resignation of William Suttor Jr.

Dates

Candidates
 Edward Combes had been the member for Orange, until his seat was declared vacant because the Elections and Qualifications Committee held that his position of Executive Commissioner for New South Wales at the Paris International Exhibition was an office of profit under the crown.

 Thomas Dalveen was a publican from Bathurst. This was his third attempt at election, having previously been unsuccessful at East Macquarie in 1878, and Orange in March 1879. He would stand four more times over the following four years, but was unsuccessful on each occasion.

Result

William Suttor Jr. resigned.

See also
Electoral results for the district of East Macquarie
List of New South Wales state by-elections

References

1879 elections in Australia
New South Wales state by-elections
1870s in New South Wales